Peter Thomas Johnson Jr. (born August 9, 1937) is a former American football halfback in the National Football League for the Chicago Bears. He played college football at the Virginia Military Institute.

Early years
Johnson attended William Fleming High School. He accepted a football scholarship from the Virginia Military Institute. As a sophomore, he contracted Polio but was able to recover. He registered 41 carries for 221 yards (5.4-yard avg.), 3 rushing touchdowns and 2 receptions for 17 yards.

As a junior, he was a backup at halfback, posting 63 carries for 270 yards (4.3-yard avg.), 5 receptions for 40 yards, 2 receiving touchdowns, 8-of-9 extra point conversions, 2 defensive touchdowns and a 39.5 punting average. He contributed to the team having an undefeated season (9-0-1) and being ranked 13th in the final Associated Press poll. He made all 3 extra point conversions in the 21-21 tie against the College of the Holy Cross.

As a senior, he became a starter at fullback after Sam Woolwine graduated. He was second on the team behind Sam Horner, with 78 carries for 392 yards (5.0-yard avg.) and 5 rushing touchdowns. He set a school record, by returning a kickoff for a 97-yard touchdown against Villanova University.

In 1979, he was inducted into the VMI Sports Hall of Fame.

Professional career

Chicago Bears
Johnson was selected by the Chicago Bears in the third round (32nd overall) of the 1959 NFL Draft. He appeared in 7 games as a halfback.

Dallas Cowboys
In 1960, Johnson was selected by the Dallas Cowboys in the expansion draft. He was converted into a defensive back during training camp. He was released on August 30.

References

1937 births
Living people
People from Bedford, Virginia
Players of American football from Virginia
American football running backs
VMI Keydets football players
Chicago Bears players